Neil Simpson (born 5 July 1970) is a British former professional boxer who competed from 1994 to 2009. At regional level, he held multiple light-heavyweight championships, including the British and Commonwealth titles between 2000 and 2003, and challenged once for the European title in 2001.

Professional career
Simpson faced undefeated Derek Chisora on 6 December 2008 at the ExCeL in London. Simpson retired on his stool at the end of the second round.

Professional boxing record

References

External links

Image - Neil Simpson

1970 births
Cruiserweight boxers
English male boxers
Light-heavyweight boxers
Living people
Boxers from Greater London
Sportspeople from Coventry